Northeast Asia or Northeastern Asia is a geographical subregion of Asia; its northeastern landmass and islands are bounded by the Pacific Ocean.

The term Northeast Asia was popularized during the 1930s by American historian and political scientist Robert Kerner. Under Kerner's definition, "Northeast Asia" included the Mongolian Plateau, the Northeast China Plain, the Korean Peninsula, the Japanese archipelago, and the mountainous regions of the Russian Far East, stretching from the Lena River in the west to the Pacific Ocean in the east.

Definitions
The definition of Northeast Asia is not static but often changes according to the context in which it is discussed.

In common usage, the term Northeast Asia typically refers to a region which includes Northeast China (Inner Mongolia and Manchuria).  Other countries and territories which make up Northeast Asia are the Russian Far East including the Sea of Okhotsk, Mongolia, Japan, North Korea, and South Korea.  Parts or the whole of Northern China are also frequently included in sources.
The Economic Research Institute for Northeast Asia defines the region as Russia, Mongolia, Japan, Korea, and China.

Prominent cities in this area include Seoul, Pusan, Incheon, Pyongyang, Tokyo, Osaka, Kobe, Kyoto, Yokohama, Hiroshima, Nagasaki, Shenyang, Harbin, Vladivostok, and Ulaanbaatar.

Economy

Northeast Asia is one of the most important economic regions of the world, accounting for 25.3% of the world's nominal GDP in 2019, which is slightly larger than the United States. It is also one of the major political centers and has significant influence on international affairs. By the end of the 1990s, Northeast Asia had a share of 12% of the global energy consumption, with a strong increasing trend. By 2030, the major economic growth in the region is expected to double or triple this share.

Biogeography

In biogeography, Northeast Asia generally refers roughly to the area spanning Japan, the Korean Peninsula, Northeast China, and the Russian Far East between Lake Baikal in Southern Siberia and the Pacific Ocean.

Northeast Asia is mainly covered by temperate forest, taiga, and the Eurasian Steppe, while tundra is found in the region's far north. Summer and winter temperatures are highly contrasted. It is also a mountainous area.

See also 
 Amur River
 Bering Strait
 East Asia
 East Asian studies
 Inner Mongolia
 Kamchatka
 Korean Peninsula
 Lake Baikal
 Manchuria
 North Asia
 Northeast China
 Russian Far East
 Russian studies
 Sea of Japan
 Sea of Okhotsk
 Siberia

References

Citations

Sources

External links 
 Center for Northeast Asian Policy Studies—Brookings Institution
 Kimura, Takeatsu - International Collation of Traditional and Folk Medicine - Northeast Asia - UNESCO

 
East Asia
East